The Dauphiné Prealps (Préalpes du Dauphiné in French) are a mountain range in the south-western part of the Alps. They are located in Rhône-Alpes and, marginally, in Provence-Alpes-Côte d'Azur (south-eastern France). Dauphiné Prealps are the central section of the French Prealps.

Etymology 
The Dauphiné is a historical region whose area roughly corresponded to that of the present departments of :Isère, :Drôme, and :Hautes-Alpes.

Geography 
Administratively the French part of the range belongs to the French departments of Isère, Drôme, Hautes-Alpes and, marginally, Alpes-de-Haute-Provence.
The whole range is drained by the Rhone river.

SOIUSA classification 
According to SOIUSA (International Standardized Mountain Subdivision of the Alps) the mountain range is an Alpine section, classified in the following way:
 Main part = Western Alps
 Major sector = South Western Alps
 Section = Dauphiné Prealps
 Code = I/A-6

Borders 
Dauphiné Prealps' borders are (anticlockwise):

 Isère (north);
 Drac, Col Bayard - which connects them with Dauphiné Alps - and Durance (east)
 Buëch, Col de Macuègne - which connects them with Provence Alps and prealps - and Toulourenc river (south);
 Rhone and Isère valleys (west).

Subdivision 
The Dauphiné Prealps are divided into five Alpine subsections:
 Dévoluy Mountains - SOIUSA code:I/A-6.I;
 Massif Céüse-Aujour - SOIUSA code:I/A-6.II;
 Massif du Vercors - SOIUSA code:I/A-6.III;
 Massif du Diois - SOIUSA code:I/A-6.IV;
 Massif des Baronnies - SOIUSA code:I/A-6.V.

Notable summits

Some notable summits of the range are:

Notable passes

Some notable passes of the range are:

References

Maps
 French official cartography (Institut Géographique National - IGN); on-line version: www.geoportail.fr